Federico Salvatore (born 17 September 1959) is an Italian singer-songwriter and comedian.

Life and career 
Born in Naples, Salvatore started his career in the late 1980s as a stand-up comedian and as a singer-songwriter of humorous and satirical songs. After enjoying a local success, he became  nationally well-known during the 1990s thanks to the semi-regular participation to the Canale 5 program Maurizio Costanzo Show. Produced by Giancarlo Bigazzi, he got a significant success with the albums Azz... and Il mago di Azz, which were both certified platinum.

In 1996 he entered the main competition at the 46th edition of the Sanremo Music Festival with the song "Sulla porta", the first Sanremo Festival song having homosexuality as main theme. In 2001 he entered the Festival di Napoli competition with "Se io fossi San Gennaro", a ballad about Naples which raised large controversities because of his lyrics critical of the social situation of the city.

Discography
Album
 
     1989 - ’Na tazzulella 'e ca...baret
     1990 - Pappagalli lat(r)ini
     1991 - Incidente al Vomero
     1992 - Cabarettombola
     1993 - Storie di un sottosviluppato... sviluppato sotto!!!
     1994 - Superfederico
     1995 - Azz...
     1996 - Il mago di Azz
     1997 - Coiote interrotto
     2000 - L'azz ’e bastone
     2002 - L'osceno del villaggio
     2004 - Dov'è l'individuo?
     2009 - Fare il napoletano... stanca!
     2011 - Se io fossi San Gennaro - LIVE
     2013 - Pulcin'hell

References

External links

1959 births
Living people
Musicians from Naples
Italian singer-songwriters